This is a list of Scottish Conservative MSPs. It includes all Members of the Scottish Parliament (MSPs) who represented the Scottish Conservatives in the Scottish Parliament.

List of MSPs

Notes

References

External links
Current and previous Members of the Scottish Parliament (MSPs), on the Scottish Parliament website
Scottish Conservatives

List
Conservative